Early is a former community in Sherman County, Oregon, United States. It was founded in 1902, with a post office established at this time. The post office was discontinued in 1919. In the 20th century, a flour mill operated in the town. It is contemporarily considered a ghost town.

References

1902 establishments in Oregon
Populated places established in 1902
Former populated places in Sherman County, Oregon
Ghost towns in Oregon
Unincorporated communities in Sherman County, Oregon